Nada Ayman Ibrahim (born 7 February 1999) is an Egyptian artistic gymnast. She competed for Egypt at the 2014 Summer Youth Olympics.

Competitive History

2014 
Nada was crowned Junior African Champion in Pretoria, South Africa in March. From this result, she qualified to the Youth Olympics.

Youth Olympics

References

1999 births
Egyptian female artistic gymnasts
Gymnasts at the 2014 Summer Youth Olympics
Living people
21st-century Egyptian women